The SN class was a series of  tender locomotives built by Baldwin Locomotive Works for the Gebishi Railway, transporting passengers and goods between Gejiu City and Shiping County.  The locomotives served on this line until its closure in 1990.

At least three members of the class are known to be preserved. No.23 is currently displayed in the China Railway Museum, while No.26 is in the Shanghai Railway Museum, No.29 is in the Yunnan Railway Museum.

Gallery

See also
Kunming–Hai Phong Railway
Gebishi Railway
DFH21
KD55

References

Railway locomotives introduced in 1924
Steam locomotives of China
0-10-0 locomotives
Baldwin locomotives
Narrow gauge steam locomotives of China
Preserved steam locomotives of China
600 mm gauge railway locomotives